Sean Jansen (born 10 May 1999) is a New Zealand rugby union player for Leicester Tigers in Premiership Rugby, his preferred position is back row.

Career
Jansen signed for Leicester on 23 February 2022, he has previously played for North Otago in New Zealand featuring for them in the 2021 Lochore Cup Final.

Jansen made his Leicester debut on 18 March 2022 in a 36–28 loss to Newcastle Falcons in the Premiership Rugby Cup, and was noted for his ball carrying and tackling. He made his full Premiership Rugby debut against Harlequins on 23 April 2022, playing number 8 in a 26–20 loss.  Jansen scored his first try for Leicester on 27 September 2022 in a 38-17 win against Wasps in the Premiership Rugby Cup.

On 10 March 2023 Jansen's signature was announced by Connacht on a two-year deal starting in the summer of 2023.

Personal life
Born in New Zealand Jansen is elgible for the  team internationally through his grandparents who were born in Monasterevin and Belfast.

References

1999 births
Living people
New Zealand rugby union players
New Zealand expatriate sportspeople in England
Leicester Tigers players
Rugby union number eights
Rugby union players from Otago
People educated at Otago Boys' High School